Pylorobranchus is a genus of worm eel known from the waters off of eastern Taiwan and from the Philippines.

Species
There are currently 2 recognized species in this genus:

 Pylorobranchus hearstorum J. E. McCosker, 2014 (Gigantic worm eel) 
 Pylorobranchus hoi J. E. McCosker & H. M. Chen, 2012

Etymology
The genus name is derived from the Greek pylorus, meaning "gatekeeper" and branchos meaning "gill" in reference to a unique lappet-like structure in front of the gill opening.

References

Ophichthidae